Rina Ketty (1 March 1911 – 23 December 1996), whose real name was Cesarina Picchetto, was an Italian singer, notably of the legendary song J'attendrai. The song became a huge hit during World War II and was appreciated by Allied soldiers and Axis soldiers alike (equalled only by Lale Andersen's Lili Marleen and perhaps by Vera Lynn's We'll Meet Again).

Biography
It is often thought that Rina Ketty was born in Turin, Italy. However, in reality she was born in Sarzana, a small village in Liguria, on 1 March 1911 in the part of town known as Vetraia. Her birth certificate number 586 is kept by the parish of Saint André. She went to Paris in the 1930s to meet up with her aunts, where she became enthralled by the artist communities of Montmartre. She loved to visit the cabarets and started out to sing in 1934 in the Lapin Agile cabaret with songs by Paul Delmet, Gaston Couté, Théodore Botrel, and Yvette Guilbert. In 1936 she recorded her first songs (on the French Pathé Records label): "La Madone aux fleurs", "Près de Naples la jolie" and "Si tu reviens". These first songs did not really achieve wide acclaim. Things changed for the better in 1938, when Rina Ketty recorded the French version of an Italian success song "Rien que mon coeur", which won the acclaimed Grand Prix du Disque, and with the song "Prière à la Madone". Her name as a singer became well established with the song "Sombreros et mantilles"; the text of which had been written by Chanty and the music by accordion player Jean Vaissade, whom she married that same year.

In 1938 Rina Ketty recorded that famous song "J'attendrai" ("I will wait"), which is actually a translation of the Italian song "Tornerai" (music by Dino Olivieri and text by Nino Rastelli); it had been a huge hit for Carlo Buti in Italy the year before. The French text was written by Louis Poterat. Rina Ketty's version of "J'attendrai" was released by Pathé Records and from the very start became an enormous success. Later it became an emblem of World War II, not in the least because the text of the song expresses in a brilliant manner the longing of so many French women anxiously awaiting the safe return of their sons and husbands from the war. Rina Ketty's Italian accent highlighting the French text of the song, worked wonderfully on the radio of those days, but also on various subsequent recorded versions.

Several composers wrote songs for Rina with her charming accent in mind. So for example Paul Mirsaki (with his "Rendez-moi mon coeur", which in fact was a reprise of "Sombreros et mantilles", but this time the text remained much closer to the Spanish original) and Jean Tranchant (with "Pourvu qu'on chante"). In 1939 Rina Ketty ventured into classical music with the song "Mon coeur soupire", an adaptation of "Voi Che sapete" from Wolfgang Amadeus Mozart's The Marriage of Figaro.

Rina Ketty divorced her husband Jean Vaissade in 1940.

Following the Nazi Occupation of France, Rina – due to her Italian upbringing –  wanted to be viewed in public as little as possible during the conflict; she performed on stage only in Switzerland. Upon the Liberation of France Rina Ketty started out again, this time with a concert in the Alhambra-Maurice Chevalier theatre of Paris followed by a 5-month tour through the whole of France. However, she was not able to regain her pre-war fame. Rina Ketty was often described as an exotic and sentimental singer; in this genre she was overtaken by Gloria Lasso, who later in turn was overtaken by Dalida (who even ventured to re-record "J'attendrai" in a disco version). The repertoire of Rina Ketty was now enlarged with new songs such as for example "Sérénade argentine" (1948), "La Samba tarentelle", and "La Roulotte des gitans" (1950). She left for Canada in 1954, and lived there some 12 years, where she would only sing her "Sombreros et Mantilles" for rather select audiences of for example Inuit. In 1965 Rina Ketty tried one last time to achieve success with a tour through France, but to no avail.

The second time Rina Ketty / Cesarina Picchetto married was to Jo Harman, and together they started a restaurant in Cannes. Her very last concert was in March 1996. She died on 23 December 1996 in the Broussailles hospital of Cannes.

More than 75 years after its creation, the song of "J'attendrai" still brings fame to its performer, not in the least for its re-appearance in Das Boot, a now legendary German film directed by Wolfgang Petersen.

Discography
 1938 – Sombreros et mantilles
 1938 – J'attendrai
 1948 – Sérénade Argentine
 1950 – La Roulotte des gitans

Bibliography
 Brunschwig, C.; Calvet, L.J & Klein, J. C. (1996): Cent ans des chanson française, 1880–1980. Éditions du Seuil, Paris  (978-2-020-6000-4 and 978-2-020-02915-5, OCLC 319774045) (http://worldcat.org/oclc/319774045&lang=fr))
 Lucini, G. (2014): Luci, lucciole e canzoni sotto il cielo di Parigi – Storie di chanteuses nella Francia del primo Novecento. Segni e Parole, Novara, 160 p.

External links
 Du Temps des Cerises aux Feuilles Mortes – Un site sur la chanson française de 1870 à 1945
 Rina Ketty Song lyrics

1911 births
1996 deaths
Pathé-Marconi artists
People from Sarzana
Italian emigrants to France
French-language singers of Italy
20th-century French women singers